Klein Field at Sunken Diamond is a college baseball park on the west coast of the United States, located on the campus of Stanford University in Stanford, California. It is the home field of the Stanford Cardinal of the Pac-12 Conference.

The stadium was built  in 1931 and has a seating capacity of 4,000. When the adjacent football stadium was originally built in 1921, dirt was excavated from the site of the future baseball stadium, which created a "sunken" field a decade later.

Originally just known simply as Sunken Diamond, the field was renamed in 2008 to honor Stanford athlete and donor Bud Klein (1927–2011) and his family.

In 2013, the Cardinal ranked 39th among Division I baseball programs in attendance, averaging 1,747 per home game.

In 2012, college baseball writer Eric Sorenson ranked the facility as the fourth best setting in Division I baseball.

The playing field at Sunken Diamond has an unorthodox alignment, with the batter and catcher facing south. The recommended orientation of a baseball diamond is east-northeast.

See also
 List of NCAA Division I baseball venues

References

External links
Stanford Athletics - Klein Field at Sunken Diamond

Sports venues in Santa Clara County, California
College baseball venues in the United States
Sports venues in the San Francisco Bay Area
Stanford Cardinal baseball
Baseball venues in California
Sports venues completed in 1931
1931 establishments in California